Strömsnäsbruk is the second largest locality situated in Markaryd Municipality, Kronoberg County, Sweden with 2,066 inhabitants in 2010.

The settlement grew up after the opening of Skåne-Smålands Järnväg (railway) in 1887. A paper mill, Strömsnäs Bruk, was erected and was the main industry in Strömsnäsbruk until it was closed down in the 1970s. Strömsnäsbruk had a maximum population of 2,500 in the 1960s.

References

External links 
  Statistics Sweden, List of localities 2005

Populated places in Kronoberg County
Populated places in Markaryd Municipality
Finnveden